John Spencer Hawks (born 1983) is the Republican state representative for District 70, which includes portions of Faulkner and Perry counties in central Arkansas.

Life and career
Hawks is a graduate of Greenbrier High School in Greenbrier, Arkansas. He obtained his Bachelor of Business Administration at Central Baptist College in Conway, Arkansas. Hawks serves on four committees: (1)  Legislative Joint Energy Committee (2) Legislative Joint Audit Committee (3) House City, County, and Local Affairs Committee (4) House Judiciary Committee. Hawks currently serves as the Secretary for the Arkansas Republican House Caucus and the Co-Chair for the Freshman Caucus. He resides in Conway in Faulkner County.

First elected in 2018, when he replaced the Republican Representative David Meeks, Hawks won reelection to his second legislative term in the general election held on November 6, 2020. With 13,256 votes (100 percent), he did not have an opponent.

References

External links
 Spencer Hawks at ballotpedia.org

Living people
Republican Party members of the Arkansas House of Representatives
1983 births
People from Conway, Arkansas
21st-century American politicians